Phoroncidia septemaculeata, is a species of spider of the genus Phoroncidia. It is found in Sri Lanka and India.

See also
 List of Theridiidae species

References

Theridiidae
Spiders of Asia
Spiders described in 1873